Deudorix batikelides is a butterfly in the family Lycaenidae. It is found in the Democratic Republic of the Congo (Uele and Niangara).

References

Butterflies described in 1920
Deudorigini
Deudorix
Endemic fauna of the Democratic Republic of the Congo